The Furnas do Bom Jesus State Park is a state park in the state of São Paulo, Brazil. It protects an area of cerrado and Atlantic Forest with high biodiversity in and around a canyon.

Location

The Furnas do Bom Jesus State Park is in the municipality of Pedregulho, São Paulo,  from the state capital of São Paulo.
The municipality is in the northeast of the state in the Ribeirão Preto mesoregion.
.The terrain consists of medium hills with flat tops and slopes with small canyons.
The name Furnas do Bom Jesus means "Caves of the Good Jesus", after the Bom Jesus canyon which leads through the park.

History

The Furnas do Bom Jesus State Park was created by state decree 30.591 of 12 October 1989.
Decree 31.644 of 31 May 1990 declared the land as being of social interest for the purpose of expropriation.
The park is a fully protected conservation unit with the objectives of preserving its ecosystems, geomorphological sites and natural landscapes, while supporting scientific research and public visits. 
Various universities use the park for scientific research, including the University of São Paulo.

Environment

The Köppen climate classification is Cwb Tropical Altitude, hot and humid in summer, cold and dry in winter.
The park protects an area with great biodiversity of native flora and fauna, including some species threatened with extinction.

Vegetation includes fragments of cerrado and Atlantic Forest seasonal semi-deciduous forest.
There are cerradões, cerrado and meadows in the interfluvial areas, continuous gallery forest in the valley bottoms, including seasonal semi-deciduous forest and seasonal alluvial semi-deciduous forest, and seasonal deciduous forest on the slopes and walls of the canyons, particularly in places where there is the least water in the dry season.
The natural cerrado vegetation on the top of the chapadas and the gentler slopes was almost entirely replaced by coffee plantations and pasturage, and is now regenerating. 
The areas that are harder to access have been little changed, preserving remnants of the original forest.

There are marshes, flooded meadows, high meadows and remnants of Atlantic forest, but the most common forms are typical cerrado, cerradão and asveredas.
There are many species of trees, grasses, bromeliads, orchids and other small plants.
The cerrado has been drastically modified by humans.
Notable species of flora include ipe (Tabebuia species), jacaranda (Jacaranda cuspidifolia), jequitibá (Cariniana estrellensis), açoita-cavalo (Luehea species) and peroba (Aspidosperma species).

Fauna includes species such as armadillo (Dasypus species), southern tamandua (Tamandua tetradactyla) and the threatened Ocelot (Leopardus pardalis) and cougar (Puma concolor).

Visiting

Visitors are attracted by the natural beauty of the forests and waterfalls.
There are viewpoints in the Santa Luzia and Taquari centers.
The administrative headquarters of the park are in the Santa Luzia Center.
There are several trails leading through the park:

Notes

Sources

State parks of Brazil
Protected areas established in 1989
1989 establishments in Brazil
Protected areas of São Paulo (state)